Brunjes is a surname. Notable people with the surname include:

Emma Brunjes, British theatre producer, talent manager, and ticket agent
George Brunjes (1889–1968), American politician
Harry Brünjes (born 1954), British physician and businessman

See also
Brunies